The 1999–2000 NBA season was the 11th season for the Orlando Magic in the National Basketball Association. During the off-season, the Magic hired retired NBA point guard, and former Turner Sports broadcast analyst Doc Rivers as head coach. The team made plenty of off-season acquisitions, as they acquired Tariq Abdul-Wahad from the Sacramento Kings, acquired Chris Gatling from the Milwaukee Bucks, acquired Ben Wallace from the Washington Wizards, acquired second-year forward Pat Garrity from the Phoenix Suns, and acquired top draft pick Corey Maggette from the Seattle SuperSonics, who selected him with the 13th pick in the 1999 NBA draft. The team also signed free agents John Amaechi, Monty Williams and undrafted rookie guard Chucky Atkins.

The Magic got off to a 15–11 start, but then struggled losing 13 of their next 14 games, holding a 24–26 record at the All-Star break. At midseason, the team traded Abdul-Wahad and Gatling to the Denver Nuggets in exchange for Ron Mercer, Chauncey Billups and former Magic forward Johnny Taylor. However, Billups never played for the Magic due to a shoulder injury he sustained in Denver, while second-year forward Matt Harpring only played just four games due to an ankle injury. The Magic played around .500 as the season progressed, posting a 7-game winning streak between March and April, finishing fourth in the Atlantic Division with a 41–41 record, falling just one game short of the playoffs by finishing ninth in the Eastern Conference.

Darrell Armstrong led the team with 16.2 points, 6.1 assists and 2.1 steals per game, while Amaechi contributed 10.5 points per game, and Atkins provided the team with 9.5 points and 3.7 assists per game off the bench, and was selected to the NBA All-Rookie Second Team. In addition, Williams averaged 8.7 points per game, while Maggette contributed 8.4 points per game off the bench, and Garrity provided with 8.2 points per game also off the bench. On the defensive side, Bo Outlaw averaged 6.0 points, 6.4 rebounds, 1.4 steals and 1.8 blocks per game, while Wallace provided with 4.8 points, 8.2 rebounds and 1.6 blocks per game, and second-year center Michael Doleac contributed 7.0 points and 4.1 rebounds per game. Despite missing the playoffs, Rivers was named Coach of the Year. This season was characterized by the slogan "Heart and Hustle", as the team was known for its hard-working style.

Following the season, Wallace and Atkins were both traded to the Detroit Pistons, while Billups signed as a free agent with the Minnesota Timberwolves, Mercer signed with the Chicago Bulls, Maggette was dealt along with Derek Strong to the Los Angeles Clippers, Harpring was sent to the Cleveland Cavaliers, and Taylor was released to free agency.

Draft picks

Roster

Roster Notes
 Point guard Chauncey Billups was acquired from the Denver Nuggets at midseason, but did not play for the Magic due to a shoulder injury.

Regular season

Season standings

z – clinched division title
y – clinched division title
x – clinched playoff spot

Record vs. opponents

Player statistics

NOTE: Please write the players statistics in alphabetical order by last name.

Awards and records
Doc Rivers – Coach of the Year
John Gabriel – Executive of the Year
Chucky Atkins – All-Rookie 2nd Team

Transactions

References

Orlando Magic seasons
Orlando
1999 in sports in Florida
2000 in sports in Florida